Stars: The Best of 1992–2002 is a compilation album and DVD from the Irish band the Cranberries, released in 2002 by Island Records. Some of the tracks on the album are different versions of the songs provided in earlier albums. The album also contains two new tracks: "New New York" and "Stars".

The first seventeen tracks contain all of the band's singles through 2002 in chronological order.

Track listing
All lyrics by Dolores O'Riordan. All music by Dolores O'Riordan and Noel Hogan, unless otherwise noted.

The limited edition version of this CD includes five live tracks recorded in Stockholm:

Awards
In 2002, they won an award in Taiwan for best selling international band with the album Stars: The Best of 1992-2002.

Charts

Weekly charts

Year-end charts

Certifications

DVD

Stars: The Best of Videos 1992–2002 is a DVD album by Irish rock band The Cranberries. It compiles 17 of the band's promotional videos including their new single "Stars", along with alternate takes and live recordings of several songs and a documentary entitled 99 Love Life & Rock 'n' Roll.

 "Dreams" (Everybody Else Is Doing It, So Why Can't We?, September 1992)
 Director: Peter Scammell
 "Linger" (Everybody Else Is Doing It, So Why Can't We?, February 1993)
 Director: Melodie McDaniel
 "Zombie" (No Need to Argue, September 1994)
 Director: Samuel Bayer
 "Ode to My Family" (No Need to Argue, November 1994)
 Director: Samuel Bayer
 "I Can't Be with You (No Need to Argue, February 1995)
 Director: Samuel Bayer
 "Ridiculous Thoughts" (No Need to Argue, July 1995)
 Director: Freckles Flynn
 "Salvation" (To the Faithful Departed, April 1996)
 Director: Olivier Dahan
 "Free to Decide" (To the Faithful Departed, August 1996)
 Director: Marty Callner
 "When You're Gone" (To the Faithful Departed, November 1996)
 Director: Karen Bellone
 "Promises" (Bury the Hatchet, March 1999)
 Director: Olivier Dahan
 "Animal Instinct" (Bury the Hatchet, July 1999)
 Director: Olivier Dahan
 "Just My Imagination" (Bury the Hatchet, September 1999)
 Director: Phil Harder
 "You and Me" (Bury the Hatchet, March 2000)
 Director: Maurice Linnane 
 "Analyse" (Wake Up and Smell the Coffee, September 2001)
 Director: Keir McFarlane
 "Time Is Ticking Out" (Wake Up and Smell the Coffee, March 2002)
 Director: Maurice Linnane
 "This Is the Day" (Wake Up and Smell the Coffee, June 2002)
 Director: Olivier Dahan
 "Stars" (Stars: The Best of 1992–2002, October 2002)
 Director: Jake Nava

Alternate takes
 "Dreams"
 "Ridiculous Thoughts"
 "When You're Gone"
 "Analyse"

Live favorites
 "Daffodil Lament" ('94 Astoria UK)
 "Empty" ('94 Astoria)
 "Sunday" ('96 tour)

Live at Vicar Street
 "Time is Ticking Out"
 "Linger"
 "In the Ghetto"
 "Ode to My Family"
 "Shattered"
 "Animal Instinct"
 "Loud and Clear"
 "I Can't Be with You"
 "Analyse"

'99 Love Life & Rock 'n' Roll
Also on the DVD is a 26-minute documentary entitled '''99 Love Life & Rock 'n' Roll and directed by Ciaran Donnelly. In it, the band members speak about their career, expectations for the future, and how some songs were composed, like "Linger" and "Zombie".

References 

The Cranberries compilation albums
The Cranberries video albums
Albums produced by Stephen Street
Albums produced by Bruce Fairbairn
2002 greatest hits albums
2002 live albums
Music video compilation albums
Live video albums
2002 video albums
Island Records compilation albums
Island Records live albums
Island Records video albums
Rockumentaries